Filip Maciejuk (born 3 September 1999 in Puławy) is a Polish cyclist, who currently rides for UCI Continental team .  On 14  August 2021 Maiejuk signed a 2 year deal to ride for UCI WorldTeam  from 2022.

Major results

2016
 1st  Time trial, National Junior Road Championships
 3rd Overall La Coupe du President de la Ville de Grudziadz
1st  Young rider classification
1st Stage 2
2017
 1st  Overall La Coupe du President de la Ville de Grudziadz
1st Stage 2
 1st  Time trial, National Junior Road Championships
 3rd  Time trial, UCI Junior Road World Championships
 5th Overall Trofeo Karlsberg
 7th Time trial, UEC European Junior Road Championships
2018
 1st  Overall Carpathian Couriers Race
1st  Young rider classification
 2nd Overall Szlakiem Walk Majora Hubala
1st  Young rider classification
1st Stage 3 (ITT)
 4th Time trial, National Road Championships
 6th Overall Le Triptyque des Monts et Chateaux
1st  Young rider classification
 7th Time trial, UEC European Under-23 Road Championships
 8th Chrono Champenois
 10th Coupe des Carpathes
2019
 2nd Time trial, National Under-23 Road Championships
2021
 1st  Overall L'Étoile d'Or
1st Stage 1 (ITT) 
 1st  Overall Carpathian Couriers Race
1st  Points classification
1st Stage 2
2022
 4th Time trial, National Road Championships

References

External links

1999 births
Living people
Polish male cyclists
People from Puławy